"The Old Rugged Cross" is a popular hymn written in 1912 by American evangelist and song-leader George Bennard (1873–1958).

History 
George Bennard was a native of Youngstown, Ohio, but was reared in Iowa. After his conversion in a Salvation Army meeting, he and his wife became brigade leaders before leaving the organization for the Methodist Church. As a Methodist evangelist, Bennard wrote the first verse of "The Old Rugged Cross" in Albion, Michigan, in the fall of 1912 as a response to ridicule that he had received at a revival meeting. Bennard traveled with Ed E. Mieras from Chicago to Sturgeon Bay, Wisconsin where they held evangelistic meetings at the Friends Church from December 29, 1912 to January 12, 1913. During the meetings Rev. George Bennard finished "The Old Rugged Cross" and on the last night of the meeting Bennard and Mieras performed it as a duet before a full house with Pearl Torstensen Berg, organist for the meeting, as accompanist. Charles H. Gabriel, a well-known gospel-song composer helped Bennard with the harmonies. The completed version was then performed on June 7, 1913, by a choir of five, accompanied by a guitar in Pokagon, Michigan, at the First Methodist Episcopal Church of Pokagon. Published in 1915, the song was popularized during Billy Sunday evangelistic campaigns by two members of his campaign staff, Homer Rodeheaver (who bought rights to the song for $50 or $500) and Virginia Asher, who were perhaps also the first to record it in 1921. The Old Rugged Cross uses a sentimental popular song form with a verse/chorus pattern in  time, and it speaks of the writer's adoration of Christ and His sacrifice at Calvary. Bennard retired to Reed City, Michigan, and the town maintains a museum dedicated to his life and ministry. A memorial has also been created in Youngstown at Lake Park Cemetery. A plaque commemorating the first performance of the song stands in front of the Friend's Church in Sturgeon Bay.

Influence 
"The Old Rugged Cross" has been a country gospel favorite ever since it became the title song of Ernest Tubb's 1952 gospel album; it has been performed by some of the twentieth century's most important recording artists, including Al Green, Andy Griffith, Anne Murray, Brad Paisley, Chet Atkins, Chris Barber, John Berry, Floyd Cramer, George Jones, Eddy Arnold, Jim Reeves, Johnny Cash and June Carter, Kevin Max, Ella Fitzgerald, Mahalia Jackson, Jo Stafford, Gordon MacRae, Merle Haggard, Patsy Cline, Loretta Lynn, Ray Price, Ricky Van Shelton, Tennessee Ernie Ford, Rahsaan Roland Kirk, Roy Rogers and Dale Evans, The Oak Ridge Boys, The Statler Brothers, Vince Gill, Willie Nelson, Alan Jackson, George Beverly Shea and John Prine on the 2007 CD "Standard Songs for Average People" with Mac Wiseman.  British television dramatist Dennis Potter used the gospel song prominently in several of his plays, most notably Pennies from Heaven (1978); and the song also played a major part in "Gridlock" (2007), an episode of the long-running sci-fi drama series Doctor Who. In early 2009, the song was covered by Ronnie Milsap on his gospel album Then Sings My Soul.

Lyrics 
On a hill far away, stood an old rugged Cross

The emblem of suff'ring and shame

And I love that old Cross where the dearest and best

For a world of lost sinners was slain

So I'll cherish the old rugged Cross

Till my trophies at last I lay down

I will cling to the old rugged Cross

And exchange it some day for a crown

Oh, that old rugged Cross so despised by the world

Has a wondrous attraction for me

For the dear Lamb of God, left His Glory above

To bear it to dark Calvary

So I'll cherish the old rugged Cross

Till my trophies at last I lay down

I will cling to the old rugged Cross

And exchange it some day for a crown

In the old rugged Cross, stain'd with blood so divine

A wondrous beauty I see

For ’twas on that old cross Jesus suffered and died

To pardon and sanctify me

So I'll cherish the old rugged Cross

Till my trophies at last I lay down

I will cling to the old rugged Cross

And exchange it some day for a crown

To the old rugged Cross, I will ever be true

Its shame and reproach gladly bear

Then He'll call me some day to my home far away

Where His glory forever I'll share

So I'll cherish the old rugged Cross

Till my trophies at last I lay down

I will cling to the old rugged Cross

And exchange it some day for a crown

Media 
In his art parody volume Art Afterpieces, Ward Kimball created a variation on the painting Expulsion from Paradise by the 15th-century artist Giovanni di Paolo, which shows God pointing at a large circle below him. Kimball centered the record label of The Old Rugged Cross, as published by Victor, on the circle in the picture, complete with the trademark of Nipper (His Master's Voice).

In On A Pale Horse, “The Old Rugged Cross” is played as the last request of a dying man.

In Series 3 Episode 3 (Gridlock) of Doctor Who, "The Old Rugged Cross" is broadcast to citizens of New New York as they traverse the motorway.

In Series 4 Episode 5 of Hetty Wainthropp Investigates, "The Old Rugged Cross" is sung by Hetty (played by Patricia Routledge) and a local male voice choir.

In the 2019 film Just Mercy, "The Old Rugged Cross" plays in the background as Herbert Richardson is executed.

In the 2021 SHOWTIME miniseries Dexter: New Blood Episode 9 "The Family Business" a version of the song performed by L Shape Lot can be heard playing in Elric Kane's vehicle as he drives Dexter to the remote cabin of Kurt Caldwell.

Notes

References

Citations

Sources 

 Kevin Mungons and Douglas Yeo, Homer Rodeheaver and the Rise of the Gospel Music Industry (Urbana: University of Illinois Press, 2021).
 "'The Old Rugged Cross' Written in Albion" Albion Recorder, 13 April 1998.
 Short biography of Bennard from Famous Iowans.
 "Bennard, George" in W. K. McNeil, ed., Encyclopedia of American Gospel Music (Routledge, 2005), 34.
 Cyberhymnal
 The Old Rugged Cross Historic Site

External links
  (acoustic guitar version)
 1920 recording with Mrs. William Asher and Homer Rodeheaver

American Christian hymns
Glen Campbell songs
Public domain music
1912 songs
1912 in Christianity
20th-century hymns